Friedel de Wet (born 26 June 1980 in Durban, Natal Province, South Africa) is a former South African first-class cricketer.

de Wet was educated at Grenswag High School in Rustenburg and went to the University of Technology in Pretoria for future education. He represented the United Cricket Board of South Africa (UCBSA) National Academy, Titans, Lions, North West and the Northerns as a right-handed batsman and a right-arm fast-medium bowler. He took 48 wickets at 22.00 for the Lions in 2006–07.

de Wet toured India with the South Africa 'A' party in 2007–08 and signed for Middlesex as a Kolpak registration for the 2008 season. On 5 January 2011 it was announced that he would play for Hampshire as a Kolpak registration for the 2011 season. He also had a spell in the Lancashire Cricket League with Chorley Cricket Club in 2008 taking 56 wickets at an average of just over 13. In 2012, de Wet announced an immediate retirement to his cricketing career due to a persistent back injury which troubled him throughout his career.

International career
In December 2009, he received "an unexpected call-up" to South Africa's Test squad for the series against England. When Dale Steyn was injured just before the first Test, de Wet was given his debut. He made 20 runs in his first Test innings and took the wicket of Alastair Cook.
in England's first innings.  He took four further wickets in the second innings, three of them coming with the second new ball in the final hour of the game as South Africa almost engineered a victory, England eventually holding on to draw with nine wickets down.

References

External links
 
 Middlesex sign de Wet

1980 births
Living people
Cricketers from Durban
South African cricketers
South Africa Test cricketers
Lions cricketers
Middlesex cricketers
Northerns cricketers
Hampshire cricketers